The 1871 Iowa gubernatorial election was held on October 10, 1871. Republican nominee Cyrus C. Carpenter defeated Democratic nominee J. C. Knapp with 61.46% of the vote.

General election

Candidates
Cyrus C. Carpenter, Republican
J. C. Knapp, Democratic

Results

References

1871
Iowa